Taxi Driver is a 1976 American neo-noir psychological drama thriller film directed by Martin Scorsese, written by Paul Schrader, and starring Robert De Niro, Jodie Foster, Cybill Shepherd, Harvey Keitel, Peter Boyle, Leonard Harris, and Albert Brooks. Set in a decaying and morally bankrupt New York City following the Vietnam War, the film follows Travis Bickle (De Niro), a veteran working as a taxi driver, and his deteriorating mental state as he works nights in the city. 

With The Wrong Man (1956) and A Bigger Splash (1973) as inspiration, Scorsese wanted the film to feel like a dream to audiences. With cinematographer Michael Chapman, filming began in the summer of 1975 in New York City, with actors taking pay cuts to ensure that the project could be completed on a low budget of $1.9 million. Production concluded that same year. Bernard Herrmann composed the film's music in what would be his final score, finished just several hours before his death; the film is dedicated to him.

The film was theatrically released by Columbia Pictures on February 7, 1976, and was a critical and commercial success despite generating controversy for its graphic violence in the climactic ending and the casting of then 12-year-old Foster in the role of a child prostitute. The film received numerous accolades including the Palme d'Or at the 1976 Cannes Film Festival and four nominations at the 49th Academy Awards, including Best Picture, Best Actor (for De Niro), and Best Supporting Actress (for Foster).

Although Taxi Driver generated further controversy for its role in John Hinckley Jr.'s motive to attempt to assassinate then-President Ronald Reagan, the film has remained popular and is considered one of the most culturally significant and inspirational of its time and one of the greatest films ever made. In 2012, Sight & Sound named it the 31st-best film ever in its decennial critics' poll, ranked alongside The Godfather Part II, and the fifth-greatest film of all time on its directors' poll. In 1994, the film was considered "culturally, historically, or aesthetically" significant by the US Library of Congress and was selected for preservation in the National Film Registry.

Plot

Travis Bickle is a 26-year-old honorably discharged U.S. Marine and Vietnam War veteran suffering from PTSD and living alone in New York City. Travis takes a job as a night shift taxi driver to cope with his chronic insomnia and loneliness. He frequently goes to the porn theaters on 42nd Street and keeps a diary in which he consciously attempts to include aphorisms such as "you're only as healthy as you feel." He becomes disgusted with the crime and urban decay that he witnesses in Manhattan and dreams about ridding "the scum off the streets."  

Travis becomes infatuated with Betsy, a campaign volunteer for Senator and presidential candidate Charles Palantine. Travis enters the campaign office where she works and asks her out for coffee, to which she agrees. Betsy confesses that she feels a special connection to Travis and agrees to go on another date with him. During their date, Travis takes Betsy to a porn theater, which repulses her and causes her to leave. He attempts to reconcile with her, but to no avail. Enraged, he storms into the campaign office where she works and berates her before he is ordered to leave. 

Experiencing an existential crisis and seeing various acts of prostitution throughout the city, Travis confides in a fellow taxi driver nicknamed Wizard about his violent thoughts. However, Wizard dismisses them and assures him that he will be fine. In an attempt to find an outlet for his rage, Travis begins a program of intense physical training. A fellow taxi driver recommends him to a black market gun dealer, Easy Andy, from whom Travis buys four handguns. At home, Travis practices drawing his weapons, and modifies one to allow him to hide and quickly deploy it from his sleeve. He  begins attending Palantine's rallies to scope out  his security. One night, Travis shoots and kills a man attempting to rob a convenience store run by a friend of his. 

On his trips around the city, Travis regularly encounters Iris, a child prostitute. He solicits her and tries to persuade her to stop prostituting herself. Soon after, Travis cuts his hair into a mohawk and attends a public rally where he plans to assassinate Palantine. However, he is chased away by Secret Service agents, who see him unzipping his jacket and putting his hand inside. That evening, Travis drives to the brothel where Iris works, and shoots her pimp, Sport. He enters the building and engages in a shootout with Sport and one of Iris's clients, a mafioso. Travis is shot several times, but manages to kill the two men. He then brawls with the bouncer, whom he manages to stab through the hand with his knife located in his shoe and finish off with a gunshot to the head. Travis attempts to commit suicide, but is out of bullets. Bloody and injured, he slumps on a couch next to a sobbing Iris. As police respond to the scene, a delirious Travis imitates shooting himself in the head using his finger.

Travis goes into a coma due to his injuries. He is heralded by the press as a heroic vigilante and is not prosecuted for the murders, also receiving a letter from Iris's father, thanking him. After recovering, Travis grows his hair out and returns to work, where he encounters Betsy as a fare; they interact cordially, with Betsy saying she followed his story in the newspapers. Travis drops her at home, and declines to take her money, driving off with a smile. He suddenly becomes agitated after noticing something in his rearview mirror.

Cast 

Credits adapted from:

Production

Development 
Director Martin Scorsese has stated that it was Brian De Palma who introduced him to Paul Schrader, and Taxi Driver arose from Scorsese's feeling that movies are like dreams or drug-induced reveries. He attempted to imbue within the viewer the feeling of being in a limbo state between sleeping and waking. The director cites Alfred Hitchcock's The Wrong Man (1956) and Jack Hazan's A Bigger Splash (1973) as inspirations for his camerawork in the movie. In writing the script, Schrader drew inspiration from the diaries of Arthur Bremer, who shot presidential candidate George Wallace in 1972, as well as from the Harry Chapin song "Taxi," which is about an old girlfriend getting into a cab. For the ending of the story, in which Bickle becomes a media hero, Schrader was inspired by Squeaky Fromme's attempted assassination of President Gerald Ford, which resulted in her being on the cover of Newsweek.

Schrader also used himself as inspiration. In a 1981 interview with Tom Snyder on The Tomorrow Show, he related his experience of living in New York City while battling chronic insomnia, which led him to frequent pornographic bookstores and theaters because they remained open all night. Following a divorce and a breakup with a live-in girlfriend, he spent a few weeks living in his car. After visiting a hospital for a stomach ulcer, Schrader wrote the screenplay for Taxi Driver in "under a fortnight." He states, "The first draft was maybe 60 pages, and I started the next draft immediately, and it took less than two weeks." Schrader recalls, "I realized I hadn't spoken to anyone in weeks [...] that was when the metaphor of the taxi occurred to me. That is what I was: this person in an iron box, a coffin, floating around the city, but seemingly alone." Schrader decided to make Bickle a Vietnam vet because the national trauma of the war seemed to blend perfectly with Bickle's paranoid psychosis, making his experiences after the war more intense and threatening.

In Scorsese on Scorsese, Scorsese mentions the religious symbolism in the story, comparing Bickle to a saint who wants to cleanse or purge both his mind and his body of weakness. Bickle attempts to kill himself near the end of the movie as a tribute to the samurai's "death with honor" principle. Dustin Hoffman was offered the role of Travis Bickle but turned it down because he thought that Scorsese was "crazy."

Pre-production 
While preparing for his role as Bickle, De Niro was filming Bernardo Bertolucci's 1900 in Italy. According to Boyle, he would "finish shooting on a Friday in Rome ... get on a plane ... [and] fly to New York." De Niro obtained a taxi driver's license, and when on break, would pick up a taxi and drive around New York for a couple of weeks before returning to Rome to resume filming 1900. De Niro apparently lost  and listened repeatedly to a taped reading of the diaries of criminal Arthur Bremer. When he had time off from shooting 1900, De Niro visited an army base in Northern Italy and tape-recorded soldiers from the Midwestern United States, whose accents he thought might be appropriate for Travis's character.

Scorsese brought in the film title designer Dan Perri to design the title sequence for Taxi Driver. Perri had been Scorsese's original choice to design the titles for Alice Doesn't Live Here Anymore in 1974, but Warner Bros would not allow him to hire an unknown designer. By the time Taxi Driver was going into production, Perri had established his reputation with his work on The Exorcist, and Scorsese was now able to hire him. Perri created the opening titles for Taxi Driver using second unit footage which he color-treated through a process of film copying and slit-scan, resulting in a highly stylised graphic sequence that evoked the "underbelly" of New York City through lurid colors, glowing neon signs, distorted nocturnal images, and deep black levels. Perri went on to design opening titles for a number of major films after this, including Star Wars (1977) and Raging Bull (1980).

Filming 
On a budget of only $1.9 million, various actors took pay cuts to bring the project to life. De Niro and Cybill Shepherd received only $35,000 to make the film, while Scorsese was given $65,000. Overall, $200,000 of the budget was allocated to performers in the movie.

Taxi Driver was shot during a New York City summer heat wave and sanitation strike in 1975. The film ran into conflict with the Motion Picture Association of America (MPAA) due to its violence. Scorsese de-saturated the colors in the final shootout, which allowed the film to get an R rating. To capture the atmospheric scenes in Bickle's taxi, the sound technicians would get in the trunk while Scorsese and his cinematographer, Michael Chapman, would ensconce themselves on the back seat floor and use available light to shoot. Chapman later admitted the filming style was heavily influenced by New Wave filmmaker Jean-Luc Godard and his cinematographer Raoul Coutard, as the crew did not have the time or money to do "traditional things." When Bickle decides to assassinate Senator Palantine, he cuts his hair into a mohawk. This detail was suggested by actor Victor Magnotta, a friend of Scorsese's who had a small role as a Secret Service agent and had served in Vietnam. Scorsese later noted that Magnotta told them that, "in Saigon, if you saw a guy with his head shaved—like a little Mohawk—that usually meant that those people were ready to go into a certain Special Forces situation. You didn't even go near them. They were ready to kill."

Filming took place on New York City's West Side, at a time when the city was on the brink of bankruptcy. According to producer Michael Phillips, "the whole West Side was bombed out. There really were row after row of condemned buildings and that's what we used to build our sets [...] we didn't know we were documenting what looked like the dying gasp of New York." The tracking shot over the shootout scene, filmed in an actual apartment, took three months of preparation; the production team had to cut through the ceiling to shoot it.

Music 

The music by Bernard Herrmann was his final score before his death on December 24, 1975, several hours after Herrmann completed the recording for the soundtrack, and the film is dedicated to his memory. Scorsese, a long-time admirer of Herrmann, had particularly wanted him to compose the score; Herrmann was his "first and only choice". Scorsese considered Herrmann's score of great importance to the success of the film: "It supplied the psychological basis throughout." The album The Silver Tongued Devil and I from Kris Kristofferson was used in the film, following Alice Doesn't Live Here Anymore (1974) where Kristofferson played a supporting role.

Controversies

Casting of Jodie Foster 
Some critics showed concern over 12-year-old Foster's presence during the climactic shoot-out. Foster said that she was present during the setup and staging of the special effects used during the scene; the entire process was explained and demonstrated for her, step by step. Moreover, Foster said, she was fascinated and entertained by the behind-the-scenes preparation that went into the scene. In addition, before being given the part, Foster was subjected to psychological testing, attending sessions with a UCLA psychiatrist, to ensure that she would not be emotionally scarred by her role, in accordance with California Labor Board requirements monitoring children's welfare on film sets.

Additional concerns surrounding Foster's age focus on the role she played as Iris, a prostitute. Years later, she confessed how uncomfortable the treatment of her character was on set. Scorsese did not know how to approach different scenes with the actress. The director relied on Robert De Niro to deliver his directions to the young actress. Foster often expressed how De Niro, in that moment, became a mentor to her, stating that her acting career was highly influenced by the actor's advice during the filming of Taxi Driver.

John Hinckley Jr. 
Taxi Driver formed part of the delusional fantasy of John Hinckley Jr. that triggered his attempted assassination of President Ronald Reagan in 1981, an act for which he was found not guilty by reason of insanity. Hinckley stated that his actions were an attempt to impress Foster, on whom Hinckley was fixated, by mimicking Travis's mohawked appearance at the Palantine rally. His attorney concluded his defense by playing the movie for the jury. When Scorsese heard about Hinckley's motivation behind his assassination attempt, he briefly thought about quitting film-making as the association brought a negative perception of the film.

MPAA rating 
The climactic shoot-out was considered intensely graphic by some critics, who even considered giving the film an X rating. The film was booed at the Cannes Film Festival for its graphic violence. To obtain an R rating, Scorsese had the colors desaturated, making the brightly colored blood less prominent. In later interviews, Scorsese commented that he was pleased by the color change and considered it an improvement over the original scene. However, in the special-edition DVD, Michael Chapman, the film's cinematographer, expresses regret about the decision and the fact that no print with the unmuted colors exists anymore, as the originals had long since deteriorated.

Themes and interpretations 
Roger Ebert has written of the film's ending:There has been much discussion about the ending, in which we see newspaper clippings about Travis's "heroism" of saving Iris, and then Betsy gets into his cab and seems to give him admiration instead of her earlier disgust. Is this a fantasy scene? Did Travis survive the shoot-out? Are we experiencing his dying thoughts? Can the sequence be accepted as literally true? ... I am not sure there can be an answer to these questions. The end sequence plays like music, not drama: It completes the story on an emotional, not a literal, level. We end not on carnage but on redemption, which is the goal of so many of Scorsese's characters.

James Berardinelli, in his review of the film, argues against the dream or fantasy interpretation, stating:Scorsese and writer Paul Schrader append the perfect conclusion to Taxi Driver. Steeped in irony, the five-minute epilogue underscores the vagaries of fate. The media builds Bickle into a hero, when, had he been a little quicker drawing his gun against Senator Palantine, he would have been reviled as an assassin. As the film closes, the misanthrope has been embraced as the model citizen—someone who takes on pimps, drug dealers, and mobsters to save one little girl.

In the LaserDisc audio commentary, Scorsese acknowledged several critics' interpretation of the film's ending as Bickle's dying dream. He admits that the last scene of Bickle glancing at an unseen object implies that Bickle might fall into rage and recklessness in the future and that he is like "a ticking time bomb." Writer Paul Schrader confirms this in his commentary on the 30th-anniversary DVD, stating that Travis "is not cured by the movie's end," and that "he's not going to be a hero next time." When asked on the website Reddit about the film's ending, Schrader said that it was not to be taken as a dream sequence but that he envisioned it as returning to the beginning of the film, as if the last frame "could be spliced to the first frame, and the movie started all over again."

The film has also been associated with the 1970s wave of vigilante films, but it has also been set apart from them as a more reputable New Hollywood film. While it shares similarities with those films, it is not explicitly a vigilante film and does not belong to that particular wave of cinema.

The film can be seen as a spiritual successor to The Searchers, according to Roger Ebert. Both films focus on a solitary war veteran who tries to save a young girl who is resistant to his efforts. The main characters in both movies are portrayed as being disconnected from society and incapable of forming normal relationships with others. Although it is unclear whether Paul Schrader sought inspiration from The Searchers specifically, the similarities between the two films are evident.

The film has been labeled as "neo-noir" by some critics, while others have referred to it as an antihero film. When shown on television, the ending credits featured a black screen with a disclaimer mentioning that "the distinction between hero and villain is sometimes a matter of interpretation or misinterpretation of facts." This disclaimer was thought to have been added after the attempted assassination of Ronald Reagan in 1981, but in fact, it had been mentioned in a review of the film as early as 1979.

Reception

Box office 

The film opened at the Coronet Theater in New York City and grossed a house record of $68,000 in its first week. It went on to gross $28.3 million in the United States, making it the 17th-highest-grossing film of 1976.

Critical response 

The film received critical acclaim. Roger Ebert instantly praised it as one of the greatest films he had ever seen, claiming:
Taxi Driver is a hell, from the opening shot of a cab emerging from stygian clouds of steam to the climactic killing scene in which the camera finally looks straight down. Scorsese wanted to look away from Travis's rejection; we almost want to look away from his life. But he's there, all right, and he's suffering.

On the review aggregator Rotten Tomatoes, the film holds an approval rating of 96% based on 96 reviews and an average rating of 9.1/10. The website's critical consensus reads, "A must-see film for movie lovers, this Martin Scorsese masterpiece is as hard-hitting as it is compelling, with Robert De Niro at his best." Metacritic gives the film a score of 94 out of 100, based on reviews from 23 critics, indicating "universal acclaim."

Taxi Driver was ranked by the American Film Institute as the 52nd-greatest American film on its AFI's 100 Years...100 Movies (10th Anniversary Edition) list, and Bickle was voted the 30th-greatest villain in a poll by the same organization. The Village Voice ranked Taxi Driver at number 33 in its Top 250 "Best Films of the Century" list in 1999, based on a poll of critics. Empire also ranked him 18th in its "The 100 Greatest Movie Characters" poll, and the film ranks at No. 17 on the magazine's 2008 list of the 500 greatest movies of all time.

Time Out magazine conducted a poll of the 100 greatest movies set in New York City. Taxi Driver topped the list, placing at No. 1. Schrader's screenplay for the film was ranked the 43rd-greatest ever written by the Writers Guild of America. In contrast, Leonard Maltin gave a rating of only 2 stars and called it a "gory, cold-blooded story of a sick man's lurid descent into violence" that was "ugly and unredeeming".

In 2012, in a Sight & Sound poll, Iranian filmmaker Asghar Farhadi selected Taxi Driver as one of his 10 best films of all time. Quentin Tarantino also listed the movie among his 10 greatest films of all time.

Accolades

American Film Institute 
AFI's 100 Years...100 Heroes & Villains – #30 Villain – Travis Bickle
AFI's 100 Years...100 Movie Quotes – #10 – "You talkin' to me?"
AFI's 100 Years...100 Thrills – #22
AFI's 100 Years...100 Movies – #47
AFI's 100 Years...100 Movies (10th Anniversary Edition) – #52

Other Honors 
National Film Registry – Inducted in 1994
The film was chosen by Time as one of the 100 best films of all time.
In 2015, Taxi Driver ranked 19th on BBC's "100 Greatest American Films" list, voted on by film critics from around the world.

Legacy 
Taxi Driver, American Gigolo, Light Sleeper, and The Walker make up a series referred to variously as the "Man in a Room" or "Night Worker" films. Screenwriter Paul Schrader (who directed the latter three films) has said that he considers the central characters of the four films to be one character, who has changed as he has aged. The film also influenced the Charles Winkler film You Talkin' to Me?

The 1994 portrayal of psychopath Albie Kinsella by Robert Carlyle in British television series Cracker was in part inspired by Travis Bickle, and Carlyle's performance has frequently been compared to De Niro's as a result.

In the 2012 film Seven Psychopaths, psychotic Los Angeles actor Billy Bickle (Sam Rockwell) believes himself to be the illegitimate son of Travis Bickle.

The vigilante ending inspired Jacques Audiard for his 2015 Palme d'Or-winning film Dheepan. The French director based the eponymous Tamil Tiger character on the one played by Robert De Niro in order to make him a "real movie hero". The script of Joker by Todd Phillips also draws inspiration from Taxi Driver.

"You talkin' to me?" 
De Niro's "You talkin' to me?" speech has become a pop culture mainstay. In 2005, it was ranked number 10 on the American Film Institute's AFI's 100 Years...100 Movie Quotes.

In the relevant scene, the deranged Bickle is looking into a mirror at himself, imagining a confrontation that would give him a chance to draw his gun:"You talkin' to me? You talkin' to me? You talkin' to me? Then who the hell else are you talkin' to? You talkin' to me? Well I'm the only one here. Who the fuck do you think you're talking to?"

While Scorsese said that he drew inspiration from John Huston's 1967 movie Reflections in a Golden Eye in a scene in which Marlon Brando's character is facing the mirror, screenwriter Paul Schrader said De Niro improvised the dialogue and that De Niro's performance was inspired by "an underground New York comedian" he had once seen, possibly including his signature line. Roger Ebert said of the latter part of the phrase "I'm the only one here" that it was "the truest line in the film.... Travis Bickle's desperate need to make some kind of contact somehow—to share or mimic the effortless social interaction he sees all around him, but does not participate in." In his 2009 memoir, saxophonist Clarence Clemons said that De Niro explained the line's origins during production of New York, New York (1977), with the actor seeing Bruce Springsteen say the line onstage at a concert. In the 2000 film The Adventures of Rocky and Bullwinkle, De Niro went on to repeat the monologue with some alterations in the role of the character Fearless Leader.

Home media 

The first Collector's Edition DVD, which was released in 1999, was packaged as a single-disc edition. It contained special features such as behind-the-scenes footage and several trailers, including one for Taxi Driver.

In 2006, a 30th-anniversary 2-disc "Collector's Edition" DVD was released. The first disc contains the film itself, two audio commentaries (one by writer Schrader and the other by Professor Robert Kolker), and trailers. This edition also includes some of the special features from the earlier release on the second disc, as well as some newly produced documentary material.

To commemorate the film's 35th anniversary, a Blu-ray was released on April 5, 2011. It includes the special features from the previous 2-disc collector's edition, plus an audio commentary by Scorsese that was released in 1991 for the Criterion Collection, which was previously released on LaserDisc.

As part of the Blu-ray production, Sony gave the film a full 4K digital restoration, which included scanning and cleaning the original negative (removing emulsion dirt and scratches). Colors were matched to director-approved prints under guidance from Scorsese and director of photography Michael Chapman. An all-new lossless DTS-HD Master Audio 5.1 soundtrack was also created from the original stereo recordings by Scorsese's personal sound team. The restored print premiered in February 2011 at the Berlin Film Festival. To promote the Blu-ray, Sony also had the print screened at AMC Theatres across the United States on March 19 and 22.

Possible sequel and remake 
In late January 2005, De Niro and Scorsese announced a sequel. At a 25th-anniversary screening of Raging Bull, De Niro talked about the development of a story featuring an older Travis Bickle. In 2000, De Niro expressed interest in bringing back the character in a conversation with Actors Studio host James Lipton. In November 2013, he revealed that Schrader had written a first draft, but both he and Scorsese thought it was not good enough to proceed.

In 2010, Variety reported rumors that Lars von Trier, Scorsese, and De Niro planned to work on a remake of the film with the same restrictions used in The Five Obstructions. However, in 2014, Paul Schrader said that the remake was not being made. He commented, "It was a terrible idea" and "in Marty's mind, it never was something that should be done."

See also 
 Martin Scorsese filmography
 1976 in film
 List of films set in New York City
 Crime in New York City
 History of the United States (1964–1980)
 History of New York City (1946–1977)

References

External links 

 
 
 
 
 
 
 

1976 films
1970s American films
1970s crime thriller films
1970s English-language films
1970s psychological thriller films
1970s vigilante films
American crime thriller films
American neo-noir films
American vigilante films
Attempted assassination of Ronald Reagan
BAFTA winners (films)
Columbia Pictures films
Existentialist films
Fiction with unreliable narrators
Films about assassinations
Films about child prostitution
Films about prostitution in the United States
Films about stalking
Films about teenagers
Films about sexual repression
Films about taxis
Films directed by Martin Scorsese
Films produced by Julia Phillips
Films produced by Michael Phillips (producer)
Films scored by Bernard Herrmann
Films set in 1975
Films set in a movie theatre
Films set in New York City
Films shot in New York City
Films with screenplays by Paul Schrader
Insomnia in film
Casting controversies in film
Obscenity controversies in film
Rating controversies in film
Political controversies in film
Palme d'Or winners
United States National Film Registry films